Qaleh Now-e Avaraz (also Romanized as Qal‘eh Now-e ‘Avāraz̤; also known as Qal‘eh Now-e Bahrābād, Qal‘eh Now-e Bahrād, and Qal‘eh Now-e Qā’emmaqāmī) is a village in Tus Rural District, in the Central District of Mashhad County, Razavi Khorasan Province, Iran. At the 2006 census, its population was 12,011, in 3,040 families.

References 

Populated places in Mashhad County